Tawan Tud Burapha (lit: The Sun cut the East; English title: The Brothers) was a Thai TV drama in action/drama and heroic bloodshed genre. It remake from a Channel 5's 2001 drama of the namesake (starred Saksit Tangthong and Jesdaporn Pholdee). It aired on One31  directed and written by Kongkiat Khomsiri.

Plot summary
Tawan (The Sun) and Burapha (The East) are brothers and the sons of a well-known righteous police. They are very close as brothers. Burapha is into boxing, while Tawan wants to follow in their father's footsteps to become a police. One day, they hear a gun shot and go to see what is going on. This way, they witness a murder and when the time comes to point the finger at the killer, Tawan is not hesitantto do the right thing. Burapha knows that the bad guys will not leave their family alone and he begs Tawan not to be a witness. This is how the conflict begins.

Cast
Main
Nawat Kulrattanarak as Tawan/Tawanchai
Yuke Songpaisan as Burapha
Jintanutda Lummakanon as Thicha
Monchanok Saengchaipiangpen as Joe/Joe Tha Tian
Support
Arnuttaphol Sirichomsaeng as Chatchai
Phitchanat Sakhakon as Jermchat
Sorapong Chatree as Ja Wes (Sergeant Wes)
Billy Ogan as Kieng the Red Dragon
Santisuk Promsiri as Sia Charoen (Tycoon Charoen)
Phoori Hiranyapruk as Tat
Akarat Nimitchai as Dap Suea (POL. SEN. SGT. MAJ. Suea)

Awards & nominations

International broadcast

References

External links
 Official teaser 

Thai television soap operas
2015 Thai television series debuts
2015 Thai television series endings
Thai action television series
One 31 original programming